Porphyrochroa is a genus of flies in the family Empididae.

Species
R. inconspicua Malloch, 1930

References

Empidoidea genera
Empididae